This is a Timeline of South Australian history.

Pre 1836
18,000 BC: Evidence of flint mining activity and rock art in the Koonalda Cave on the Nullarbor Plain.
1627: First recorded European sighting of the South Australian coast.
1802: South Australian coastline mapped by Matthew Flinders und Nicolas Baudin.
1802 (Circa): Unofficial settlement of Kangaroo Island by sealers.
1830: Captain Charles Sturt travels to the mouth of the Murray River in a whale boat.
1831: Captain Collet Barker explores the Adelaide Plains and climbs to the summit of Mount Lofty.

1800s

1830s

1836: South Australia proclaimed by Governor John Hindmarsh on 28 December at the Old Gum Tree, Glenelg.
1836: Site for Adelaide chosen by Colonel William Light beside the River Torrens.
1837: Colonel Light completes survey of Adelaide city centre and designs the city's grid layout.
1837: First regional town, Gawler, is founded north of Adelaide.
1837: Adelaide's first hospital opens on North Terrace.
1838: The first Australian police force is formed in Adelaide, the South Australia Police.
1838: Overlanders Joseph Hawdon and Charles Bonney arrive in Adelaide from New South Wales with 300 head of cattle.
1838: First German immigrants arrive and settle in Adelaide and surrounds.
1839: Colonel Light dies at Thebarton and is interred in Light Square beneath a memorial. He is the only person buried within "the square mile".
1839: The first road in South Australia, Port Road, is opened.
1839: Edward John Eyre begins his explorations of the Flinders Ranges and beyond.

1840s
1840: The first portion of Government House is completed, becoming the first in Australia.
1840: Royal Adelaide Show held for the first time.
1840: The Corporation of Adelaide is founded as the first municipal authority in Australia.
1840: All 26 survivors of the shipwreck Maria are murdered by Aboriginals in mysterious circumstances along the Coorong.
1841: Construction of Adelaide Gaol begins.
1841: Adelaide Hospital (later Royal) opened.
1842: Copper is discovered at Kapunda.
1843: The first Legislative Council building opens on North Terrace.
1844: The colonial Government takes control of the Corporation of Adelaide.
1845: Copper is discovered at Burra.
1845: Port Pirie founded on the upper Spencer Gulf.
1846: John Ainsworth Horrocks dies while exploring land to the northwest of Lake Torrens.
1847: St Peter's College established.
1848: Pulteney Grammar School established.

1850s
1850: The forerunner to Harris Scarfe, G. P. Harris and J. C. Lanyon, opened on Hindley Street.
1852: The Corporation of Adelaide is reconstituted. First transport of gold overland arrived in Adelaide.
1854: The township of Port Augusta at the head of Spencer Gulf is surveyed.
1854: The township of Gambierton, later Mount Gambier is founded in the South East.
1855: James Macgeorge lays telegraph line between Adelaide and Port Adelaide.
1856: The South Australian Institute, from which the State Library, State Museum and Art Gallery derived, is founded.
1856: Government telegraph line and steam railway between Adelaide and Port Adelaide opened.
1856: South Australia becomes one of the first places in the world to enact the Secret Ballot.
1857: Adelaide Botanic Gardens opened at today's site in the Parklands at the corner of North and East Terraces.
1858: Melbourne-Adelaide telegraph line opened.
1858: The first edition of The Advertiser newspaper is published.
1859: A jetty of more than 350 metres in length is constructed at Glenelg.
1859: Shipwreck of SS Admella off Carpenter Rocks in the South East. 89 dead. Worst maritime disaster to this day.

1860s
1860: Thorndon Park Reservoir supplied water through new reticulation system.
1861: East Terrace markets opened.
1861: Copper discovered at Moonta, on the Yorke Peninsula.
1862: John McDouall Stuart successfully crosses the continent from north to south on his sixth attempt.
1863: First gas supplied to city.
1864–1867: Great drought
1865: Bank of Adelaide founded.
1866: The Italianate Adelaide Town Hall opened.
1866: First oil exploration in Australia at Alfred Flat near Salt Creek, along the Coorong.
1867: Prince Alfred, Duke of Edinburgh, made first royal visit to Adelaide.
1869: The City Market (later Central) opened on Grote Street.
1869: Prince Alfred College established.

1870s
1870: Port Adelaide Football Club established.
1871 The South Australian Cricket Association is formed.
1872: The General Post Office opened. Adelaide became first Australian capital linked to Imperial London with completion of the Overland Telegraph.
1873: First cricket match played at Adelaide Oval.
1874: The Adelaide Oval is officially opened.
1874: The University of Adelaide founded.
1874: Iron ore mined and smelted at Mt. Jagged, near Victor Harbor, then abandoned.
1875: Adelaide Steamship Company founded.
1876: Adelaide Children's Hospital founded.
1877: The Adelaide Bridge across the Torrens completed.
1877: Copper mines at Burra and Kapunda close.
1878: First horse-drawn trams in Australia commenced operations in the city.
1879: Foundation stone of the University of Adelaide laid.

1880s
1880: Telephone introduced in South Australia.
1880: Fort Glanville opens.
1880: Reformatory Hulk Fitzjames commissioned and moored off Largs Bay.
1881: The Art Gallery of South Australia opened by Prince Albert Victor.
1881: Torrens Lake created following the construction of weir.
1881: Coopers Brewery is established.
1881: Drought ruins thousands of farmers on marginal land in the Mid North and Goyder's Line is recognised as the limit to agricultural settlement.
1882: First water-borne sewerage service in Australia commenced.
1882: The City Baths opened on King William Road.
1883: Adelaide Zoological Gardens opened.
1884: Adelaide Trades and Labor Council inaugurated.
1884: Fort Largs opens.
1885: The Adelaide Arcade opens.
1886: Commercial Bank of South Australia failed in February.
1885: Flinders Column erected at the Mount Lofty Summit.
1887: Express train services between Adelaide and Melbourne commence.
1887: Stock Exchange of Adelaide forms.
1889: School of Mines and Industries opens on North Terrace.
1889: Lead smelters built at Port Pirie.

1890s

1891: The Central Australia Railway reaches Oodnadatta in the far north.
1892: First public statue, Venus (Venere Di Canova), unveiled on North Terrace.
1892: Following drop in share values, Bank of South Australia taken over by the Union Bank of Australia.
1894: Constitutional Amendment (Adult Suffrage) Act 1894, the world's second Act granting women suffrage and the first granting women the right to stand for parliament passed in Parliament House on North Terrace.
1896: Moving pictures shown for first time in South Australia at Theatre Royal on Hindley Street.
1896: Happy Valley Reservoir opened.
1896: Adelaide Hospital Board of Management sacked by the Government. The dysfunctional nature of the workplace came to a head when E. Willis Way, no friend of Premier Kingston, was accused of nepotism.
1897: Constitutional Convention on Federation held in Adelaide.
1899: South Australian contingent leaves Adelaide for the Second Boer War.
1899: State Referendum on Federation: South Australia votes Yes (70.2%).

1900s

1900s
1900: First electricity station opened in South Australia at Grenfell Street.
1901: Adelaide became a state capital upon the establishment of the Commonwealth of Australia on 1 January. The Duke and Duchess of York visit.
1901: Whyalla founded on the upper Spencer Gulf as a port for iron ore from the Middleback Ranges.
1904: Adelaide Fruit and Produce Exchange opens in the East End.
1904: State Flag of South Australia is officially adopted.
1906: Federal Referendum on Senate Elections: South Australia votes Yes (86.99%).
1908: Outer Harbor opens.
1908: Adelaide High School established.
1909: Electric tram services begin.

1910s
1910: Federal Referendum on Surplus Revenue: South Australia votes No (50.94%).
1911: Federal Referendum on Trade and Commerce: South Australia votes No (61.93%).
1912: The Verco Building, an early 'skyscraper', is built on North Terrace.
1913: Metropolitan abattoirs open.
1913: Federal Referendum on Trade and Commerce: South Australia votes Yes (51.32%).
1914: South Australian troops join their Australian comrades in Europe to fight in the Great War.
1914: Torrens Island Internment Camp opens.
1915: Liquor bars close at 6 pm following referendum, creating the six o'clock swill.
1915: Torrens Island Internment Camp closes.
1915: Four women Justices of the Peace appointed, the first in Australia.
1915: Cheer-up Hut opens 4 November, first anniversary of Cheer-Up Society.
1917: German private schools close because of the Great War.
1917: First trains to Perth following completion of east–west continental railway.
1918: Railway line from Hallett Cove to Willunga opens.
1918: Railway branchline between Balhannah and Mount Pleasant opens.
1919: Adelaide awarded official city status and Mayor became Lord Mayor.
1919: Railway branchline between Monarto South and Sedan opens.

1920s
1921: Politician Percy Brookfield is shot at the Riverton railway station and later dies.
1924: 5CL, Adelaide's first AM broadcaster "on the air".  
1924: James Stobie invents the Stobie pole, now a South Australian icon.
1924: Township of Murray Bridge is founded.
1925: Wayville Showgrounds open.
1927: North–south railway extended.
1927: Duke and Duchess of York visit.
1928: Federal Referendum - South Australia Votes:
Yes (62.68%) on State Debt
1929: Electric service to Glenelg commences.

1930s
1932: Local government overhauled when Government redefined boundaries and names and abolished others.
1933: First John Martin's Christmas Pageant
1935: Many German place names, which had been changed during the Great War, are restored.
1936: South Australia celebrates its centenary.
1936: South Australian Housing Trust is founded.
1937: First trolley bus services commence.
1937: First permanent traffic signals installed.
1937: Federal Referendum - South Australia Votes:
No (59.87%) on Aviation
No (79.17%) on Marketing
1937: Outbreak of poliomyelitis.
1938: South Australian Housing Trust completes first dwelling.
1939: Worst heat wave recorded with disastrous bushfires and highest Adelaide temperature of 47.6° Celsius.
1939: New Parliament House opened on North Terrace by the Governor-General Lord Gowrie.

1940s
1940: Birkenhead Bridge opens.
1940: Ship building begins at Whyalla.
1940: Pinguin enters South Australian waters, laying sea mines along vital shipping lanes.
1940: Loveday POW camp opens
1942: Rationing of tea and clothing introduced.
1943: Rationing of butter introduced.
1944: Federal Referendum - South Australia Votes:
Yes (50.64%) on Post War Reconstruction and Democratic Rights
1944: Rationing of meat introduced.
1944:  attacks the Greek freighter Ilissos off the Limestone Coast.
1945: Gas and electricity restrictions imposed.
1945: Hills Industries founded.
1946: Federal Referendum - South Australia Votes:
Yes (51.73%) on Social Services
No (51.26%) on Marketing
No (51.80%) on Industrial Employment
1947: Orchards ripped up following discovery of fruit fly in the metropolitan area.
1948: Federal Referendum - South Australia Votes:
No (57.85%) on Rents and Prices
1948: Glenelg jetty destroyed and widespread damage caused by severe storms.
1948: Clothing and meat rationing abolished.
1948: Holden begins production.

1950s
1950: State Election: The Liberal Party, led by Thomas Playford, holds onto government.
1950: Petrol, butter and tea rationing abolished.
1950: Port Pirie proclaimed South Australia's first provincial city.
1951: Federal Referendum - South Australia Votes:
No (52.71%) on Communists and Communism
1953: State Election: The Liberal Party, led by Thomas Playford, holds onto government.
1954: Adelaide is hit by an earthquake causing much property damage but no loss of life.
1954: Queen Elizabeth II makes first sovereign visit to Adelaide.
1954: Mannum–Adelaide pipeline completed, pumping water from the River Murray to metropolitan reservoirs.
1955: Adelaide Airport at West Beach opens.
1955: Elizabeth officially proclaimed.
1956: State Election: The Liberal Party, led by Thomas Playford, holds onto government.
1958: Queen Elizabeth The Queen Mother, visits Adelaide.
1958: First parking meters installed.
1958: South Para Reservoir opened and connected to Adelaide water supply.
1958: Last street tram removed, leaving only the Glenelg tram line.
1959: Television broadcasting commences in Adelaide with NWS-9.  ADS-7 (now ADS-10) begins broadcasting one month later.
1959: State Election: The Liberal Party, led by Thomas Playford, holds onto government.

1960s
1960: Adelaide Festival of Arts held for the first time.
1962: State Election: The Liberal Party, led by Thomas Playford, holds onto government.
1963: Port Stanvac oil refinery begins operations.
1963: Queen Elizabeth II visits Adelaide.
1963: Gas discovered in the Cooper Basin.
1964: Record wind gust of 148 kilometres per hour recorded in Adelaide.
1965: State Election: The Labor Party, led by Frank Walsh, wins government for the first time in 33 years.
1965: Television station SAS-10 (Now SAS-7) begins broadcasting.
1966: Flinders University opens at Bedford Park.
1966: Beaumont children go missing at Glenelg beach.
1967: Lotteries commence in South Australia.
1967: Liquor trading hours extended.
1967: Torrens Island Power Station begins operations.
1967: Premier Frank Walsh retires and is replaced by Don Dunstan.
1967: Federal Referendum - South Australia Votes:
Yes (86.26%) on Aboriginals
No (66.09%) on Parliament
1968: State Election: The Liberal Party, led by Steele Hall, wins government.

1970s
1970: State Election: The Labor Party, led by Don Dunstan, wins government. South Australia becomes first state to reform abortion laws.
1971: Fluoridation of water supply commences.
1973: State Election: The Labor Party, led by Don Dunstan, holds onto government.
1973: New hospital opens at Modbury.
1973: Two children disappear from Adelaide Oval and are never seen again.
1973: Federal Referendum - South Australia Votes:
No (58.84%) on Commodity Prices
No (71.75%) on Incomes
1974: Prince Philip, The Duke of Edinburgh, visits Adelaide.
1974: Federal Referendum - South Australia Votes:
No (52.86%) on Simultaneous Elections
No (55.74%) on Mode of Altering the Constitution
No (55.89%) on Democratic Elections
No (57.48%) on Local Government Bodies
1975: State Election: The Labor Party, led by Don Dunstan, holds onto government.
1975: The International Equestrian Exposition is held in Adelaide and attended by Princess Anne.
1975: The Adelaide City Council adopts the City of Adelaide Plan.
1976: Rundle Mall, Australia's first pedestrian mall, opens between King William and Pulteney streets.
1977: Queen Elizabeth and Prince Philip visit Adelaide to open the Adelaide Festival Centre.
1977: Late night shopping commences.
1977: Federal Referendum - South Australia Votes:
Yes (65.99%) on Simultaneous Elections
Yes (76.59%) on Senate Vacancies
Yes (83.29%) on Referendums
Yes (85.57%) on Retirement of Judges
1978: The remains of seven women are found in bushland near Truro.
1979: Don Dunstan resigns as Premier and is replaced by Des Corcoran.
1979: State Election: The Liberal Party, led by David Tonkin, wins government.

1980s

1980: Thirty-five homes destroyed in an Adelaide Hills bushfire.
1981: Prince Charles, The Prince of Wales, visits Adelaide.
1982: State Election: The Labor Party, led by John Bannon, wins government.
1982: International air services begin at Adelaide Airport.
1983: The Ash Wednesday fires claim 28 lives throughout the state.
1983: The Prince and Princess of Wales visit Adelaide.
1983: Wendy Chapman elected the first woman Lord Mayor of Adelaide.
1984: South Australia officially adopts the current Coat of Arms.
1984: Keswick Railway Terminal opens.
1984: Federal Referendum - South Australia votes:
No (50.02%) on Terms of Senators
No (54.06%) on Interchange of Powers
1985: State Election: The Labor Party, led by John Bannon, holds onto government.
1985: The Adelaide Casino opens in the Adelaide railway station as part of the multimillion-dollar Adelaide Station and Environs Redevelopment (ASER).
1985: The first Australian Grand Prix held on the Adelaide Street Circuit.
1986: Queen Elizabeth II and Prince Philip visit Adelaide.
1986: Pope John Paul II visits Adelaide and holds Mass to a gathering of hundreds of thousands in the East Parklands.
1986: The South Australian Maritime Museum opens.
1986: South Australia celebrates its sesqui-centenary as "Jubilee 150".
1987: The Collins class submarine contract awarded to the Australian Submarine Corporation at Outer Harbor.
1987: The Adelaide Convention Centre opens on North Terrace.
1988: The Prince and Princess of Wales visit Adelaide.
1988: Federal Referendum - South Australia votes:
No (73.24%) on Parliamentary Terms
Yes (69.39%) on Fair Elections
No (70.15%) on Local Government
Yes (73.99%) on Rights and Freedoms.
1989: State Election: The Labor Party, led by John Bannon, holds onto government.
1989: The Bicentennial Conservatory, referred to as "The Crystal Pasty", opens at the Botanic Gardens.

1990s
1991: State Bank of South Australia collapses plunging South Australia into a debt of $3.1 billion.
1991: The University of South Australia formed from a merger of several institutions.
1991: The $40 million Adelaide Entertainment Centre opened.
1991: Adelaide Football Club enters the AFL after being established in late 1990.
1992: First WOMADelaide, at Botanic Park
1992: John Bannon resigns as Premier and is replaced by Lynn Arnold.
1992: The final edition of The News newspaper is published.
1993: State Election: The Liberal Party, led by Dean Brown, wins government in a landslide.
1993: Poker machines installed for first time in South Australia.
1994: Sunday trading introduced in the Adelaide city centre.
1994: High-speed ferry service from Glenelg to Kangaroo Island begins.
1995: The Australian Grand Prix is held in Adelaide for the last time.
1995: United Water is contracted to manage Adelaide's water and sewerage systems.
1995: The Local Government (Boundary Reform) Act, 1995 passed to encourage municipal amalgamations, resulting in an overhaul of local government.
1997: Port Adelaide Football Club enters the AFL.
1997: State Election: The Liberal Party, led by John Olsen, narrowly holds onto government.
1997: Adelaide Football Club wins its first AFL premiership.
1998: Adelaide Football Club wins its second AFL premiership.
1999: Eight bodies are found in a disused bank vault in Snowtown, further bodies were later found, revealing Australia's worst serial killings.
1999: Federal Referendum - South Australia votes:
No (56.43%) on an Australian Republic
No (61.90%) on Constitution Preamble.

2000s

2000s

2000: Adelaide-Crafers Highway opened.
2001: John Olsen resigns as Premier and is replaced by Rob Kerin.
2001: Construction of Alice Springs-Darwin track starts.
2001: The National Wine Centre of Australia opens in the north-east of the Adelaide Parklands.
2002: State Election: The Labor Party, led by Mike Rann, narrowly wins government.
2003: The transcontinental railway line from Adelaide to Darwin is completed.
2003: Port Stanvac Oil Refinery closed.
2004: Port Adelaide Football Club wins its first AFL premiership.
2004: First train travels on the completed Adelaide-Darwin railway.
2005: Nine people die in bushfires on the Eyre Peninsula.
2006: State Election: The Labor Party, led by Mike Rann, retains government in a landslide.
2009: Wind gusts of 152 km/h recorded at Adelaide Airport.

2010s
2010: State Election: The Labor Party, led by Mike Rann, retains government with a reduced majority.
2010: Northern Expressway opened.
2014: State election, Labor Party now led by Jay Weatherill retains government with a further reduced majority
2014: South Road Superway opened
 2015 Sampson Flat bushfires in January and 2015 Pinery bushfire in November both destroyed houses near Adelaide (the Pinery fire also killed two people)

See also
 History of South Australia
 History of Adelaide
 Governors of South Australia
 Premiers of South Australia
 List of Mayors and Lord Mayors of Adelaide

 History of Australia
South Australian timelines